This is a list of Scottish football (soccer) families.

Families included on the list must have
 at least, one member of the family is capped by a national team on the senior level or an important person in the game of football (e.g., notable coaches, referees, club chairmen, etc.)
 a second member must be a professional player or capped by a national team on the U-17 level or above.

The most senior family member is listed first.

List

A
 Charlie Adam Sr., Charlie Adam (son), Grant Adam (son)
 David Anderson, Harry Anderson (brother)

B
  Gerry Baker,  Joe Baker (brother),  Ryan Strain (grandson)
 Eamonn Bannon, Paul Telfer (nephew)
 Barney Battles, Sr., Barney Battles, Jr.
 Bobby Baxter Sr,  Bobby Baxter Jr (son)
 Jim Baxter, George Kinnell (second cousin), Andy Kinnell (second cousin), Ian Dair (brother-in-law), Jason Dair (nephew), Lee Dair (nephew)
 Jack Bell, Laurie Bell (brother) 
 Alec Bennett, James Bennett (brother)
 Peter Bennie, Bob Bennie (brother), John Bennie (brother), Peter Bennie (son), Bob Bennie (nephew)
 William Berry, Davidson Berry (brother)
 Jim Bett,  Baldur Bett (son),  Calum Bett (son)
 Ian Black Sr., Ian Black Jr. (son)
 Bob Blyth, William Blyth (brother), Robert Blyth (son), Alec Shankly (nephew), Jimmy Shankly (nephew), John Shankly (nephew), Bob Shankly (nephew), Bill Shankly (nephew)
 Andy Bowman, Dave Bowman (son)
 Rachael Boyle (née Small),  Martin Boyle (husband)
 James Brandon, Tom Brandon (brother), Harry Brandon (cousin),  Tom Brandon Jr (nephew / son of Tom)
 Des Bremner, Kevin Bremner (brother)
 Hutton Bremner, Gordon Bremner (brother) 
 Frank Brogan, Jim Brogan (brother)
 Craig Brown, Jock Brown (brother)
 Brown (2): see Lambie
 John Browning Sr, John Browning Jr. (son)
 John Brownlie, Paul Brownlie (son)
 Daniel Bruce, Walter Bruce (brother)
 Martin Buchan, George Buchan (brother), Jamie Buchan (son)
Campbell Forsyth, Stuart Burgess (son),  Cameron Burgess (grandson) 
 George Burley, Craig Burley (nephew)
 Matt Busby,  Don Gibson (son-in-law)
  Terry Butcher, Pat Nevin (cousin)

C
 Steve Cadden, Chris Cadden (son), Nicky Cadden (son, twin brother of Chris)
 Paul Caddis, Liam Caddis (brother)
 Colin Calder,  (brothers-in-law)
 David Calderhead Sr., David Calderhead Jr. (son)
 Steven Caldwell, Gary Caldwell (brother)
 Callaghan: see Flannigan
 Dick Campbell, Ian Campbell (twin brother), Iain Campbell (son)
 John Capaldi,  Tony Capaldi (son)
 David Chalmers, Stevie Chalmers (son), Paul Chalmers (grandson)
 Jack Chaplin, George Chaplin (brother), Alex Chaplin (brother)
 Charlie Christie, Ryan Christie (son)
 Robert Christie, Alex Christie (brother)
 John Clark, Martin Clark (son) 
 Paul Clarke, Steve Clarke (brother)
 William Collier, Jock Collier (brother)
 Donald Colman, Rachel Corsie (great-granddaughter)
 James Comrie, George Comrie (brother), John Comrie (cousin), Malcolm Comrie (nephew)
 Alfie Conn Sr., Alfie Conn Jr. (son)
 Mike Conroy Sr., Mike Conroy Jr. (son)
 Doug Considine, Andy Considine (son)
 Neale Cooper, Alex Cooper (son)
 James Cowan, John Cowan (brother)
 Don Cowie, Shelley Grant (wife – also twin sister of Suzanne Grant, below)
 Sammy Cox, Jackie Cox (cousin)
 Joe Craig, Steven Craig (son)
 Pat Crerand,  Charlie Gallagher
 Willie Cringan, Peter Nellies (brother-in-law), Robert Cringan (brother), Jimmy Cringan (brother)
 John Cross, Willie Cross (brother)
 Andy Cunningham, William Cunningham (brother)
 Willie Cunningham, Jimmy Baxter (cousin)

D
 Kenny Dalglish, Paul Dalglish (son)
 Billy Davies, John Davies (brother), John Spencer (brother-in-law), Brad Spencer (nephew – son of John Spencer)
 Paul Deas, Robbie Deas (uncle)
 Jimmy Delaney, Pat Delaney (son), John Kennedy (grandson)
 Divers – see Gallacher
 Tommy Docherty,  Mick Docherty (son)
 Tom Donnelly, Simon Donnelly (son)
 Billy Dougall, Peter Dougall (brother), Jimmy Dougal (brother), Neil Dougall (son)
 Peter Dowds, Mike Haughney (great-nephew)
 Bill Dowie,  Christie Rampone (great-granddaughter)
 Michael Dunbar, Tom Dunbar (brother)
 Johnny Duncan, Tom Duncan (brother)
 Billy Dunlop, Jimmy Miller (nephew), Will Gibson (brother-in-law of Miller)
 Jimmy Dunn Sr., Jimmy Dunn Jr. (son), Alex Harris (great-nephew)
 Gordon Durie, Scott Durie (son)

E
 Lisa Evans,  Vivianne Miedema (partner)

F
 Alex Ferguson, Martin Ferguson (brother), Darren Ferguson (son)
 Derek Ferguson, Barry Ferguson (brother), Lewis Ferguson (son)
Bob Ferrier Sr.,  Bob Ferrier Jr. (son)
 Robert Findlay, Tom Findlay (brother),  William Findlay (son)
 Patrick Flannigan, David Flannigan (brother), Willie Callaghan (nephew), Tommy Callaghan (nephew / brother of Willie), Willie Callaghan Jr (great-nephew, son of Willie), Tommy Callaghan Jr (great-nephew, son of Tommy), Liam Callaghan (great-nephew, son of Willie Jr), Craig Johnston (cousin of Liam)
 Robert Fleck, John Fleck (nephew)
 Jim Fleeting, Julie Fleeting (daughter – also wife of Colin Stewart – below)
 James Forrest, Alan Forrest (brother)
 Forrest (2): see Willoughby 
 Campbell Forsyth,  Cameron Burgess (grandson)

G
 Hughie Gallacher, Jackie Gallacher (son)
 Jim Gallacher, Paul Gallacher (son), Tony Gallacher (nephew)
 Pat Gallacher, John McPhail (nephew), Billy McPhail (nephew)
  Patsy Gallacher, Willie Gallacher (son), Tommy Gallacher (son), John Divers Sr. (nephew), Brian Gallacher (grandson, son of Tommy), Kevin Gallacher (grandson), John Divers Jr. (great-nephew)
 Archie Gemmill, Scot Gemmill (son)
 Neilly Gibson, Willie Gibson (son), Neil Gibson (son), James Gibson (son)
 Alan Gilzean, Ian Gilzean (son)
 Ronnie Glavin, Tony Glavin (brother)
 John Goodall,  Archie Goodall (brother)
 Lewis Goram, Andy Goram (son)
 Charlie Gough, Richard Gough (son)
 James Gourlay, Jimmy Gourlay (son)
 Donald Gow, John Gow (brother)
 Arthur Graham, Tommy Graham (brother), Jimmy Graham (brother)
 Johnny Graham, Willie Graham (brother)
 Peter Grant Sr., Peter Grant Jr. (son), Ray Grant (son)
 Suzanne Grant, Shelley Grant (twin sister), David Winters (husband), Robbie Winters (brother-in-law – brother of David), Don Cowie (brother-in-law – husband of Shelley)
 Eddie Gray, Frank Gray (brother), Stuart Gray (son), Andy Gray (nephew – son of Frank),  Archie Gray (grand-nephew - son of Andy)
 Bryan Gunn,  Angus Gunn (son)

H
 Dave Halliday, Billy Halliday (brother)
Alexander Hamilton, James Hamilton (brother), Gladstone Hamilton (brother)
 John Hansen, Alan Hansen (brother)
 Joshua Harris, Neil Harris (brother), John Harris (nephew – son of Neil)
 Kevin Hegarty, Paul Hegarty (brother), Ryan Hegarty (son)
 Colin Hendry, Callum Hendry (son)
 Sandy Herd, Alec Herd (brother), David Herd (nephew – son of Alec)
 Sandy Higgins Sr, Sandy Higgins Jr (son)
 James Howie, David Howie (brother)
 John Hughes, Pat Hughes (brother), Billy Hughes (brother)
 John Hunter, Archie Hunter (brother), Andy Hunter (brother)

I
 Stewart Imlach,  Mike Imlach (son)

J
 Bob Jack,  David Jack (son),  Rollo Jack (son)
Andrew Jackson, Jimmy Jackson (brother),  Andy Jackson (son), James Jackson (nephew / son of Jimmy),  Archie Jackson (nephew / son of Jimmy) 
 Wattie Jackson, Alex Jackson (brother)
Sammy Johnston, Allan Johnston (brother), Max Johnston (nephew, son of Allan).

K
James Kelly, Frank Kelly (son), Bob Kelly (son), Willie Hughes (son-in-law), Michael Kelly (grandson), Kevin Kelly (grandson)
Bob Kelso, James Kelso (brother), Tommy Kelso (nephew)
 Bobby Kennedy, Lorraine Kennedy (daughter)
 William Ker, George Ker (brother)
 George Key, William Key (brother)
 Alex King, John King (nephew)
 Jim Kirkland, Martha Thomas (grand-niece)

L
 Alex Lambie,  Jim Brown (nephew), John Brown (nephew), Tom Brown (nephew),  George Brown (great-nephew, son of Jim)
 John Lambie, William Lambie (brother)
 Bobby Lennox, Gary Lennox (son)
 Archie Livingstone, George Livingstone (brother)
 Alec Logan, James Logan (brother), Tommy Logan (brother)
 Harry Low, Wilf Low (brother), Willie Low (nephew), Norman Low (nephew / Wilf's son)

M
 Lou Macari, Mike Macari (son),  Paul Macari (son)
 Willie MacFadyen, Ian MacFadyen (son)
 Donald MacLaren, Ross MacLaren (brother),  Jamie Maclaren (son)
 Jimmy Mallan, Stevie Mallan Sr. (grandson), Stevie Mallan Jr. (great-grandson)
 Tom Maley, Willie Maley (brother), Alex Maley (brother)
  Gordon Marshall Sr., Gordon Marshall Jr. (son), Scott Marshall (son)
 John May, Hugh May (brother)
 Colin McAdam, Tom McAdam (brother)
 Tom McAnearney, Jim McAnearney (brother)
 Joe McBride Sr., Joe McBride Jr. (son)
 Andy McCall, Stuart McCall (son), Craig McCall (grandson - son of Stuart) 
 Archie McCall, James McCall (brother)
  Ali McCann,  Lewis McCann (brother)
 John McCartney, Willie McCartney (son)
 James McCloy, Peter McCloy (son)
 William McColl, Ian McColl (grandson)
 James McCrae, David McCrae (brother)
 Andrew McCreadie, Hugh McCreadie (brother)
  Charlie McCully,  Henry McCully (brother)
 Jock McDougall, Jimmy McDougall (brother)
  Garry McDowall, Kenny McDowall (brother)
 John McGeady,  Aiden McGeady (son)
 Darren McGeouch, Dylan McGeouch (brother)
 James McGhee,  Bart McGhee (son),  Jimmy McGhee (son)
 Jack McGinn, Stephen McGinn (grandson), John McGinn (grandson), Paul McGinn (grandson)
 Kevin McGlinchey,  Michael McGlinchey (son)
 Jimmy McGowan, Ally McGowan (brother)
 Danny McGrain, Tommy McGrain (brother)
 Arthur McInally, Tommy McInally (adopted brother)
 Jackie McInally, Alan McInally (son)
 Hugh McIntyre, James McIntyre (brother)
 Daniel McKay, Barrie McKay (brother)
 Frank McKee,  Jaimes McKee (grandson)
 Duncan McKenzie, Hamish MacKenzie (nephew)
 Angus McKinlay, Donald McKinlay (son)
 Ronnie McKinnon, Donnie McKinnon (twin brother)
 Hugh McLaughlin, Aaron Hickey (grand-nephew)
 David McLean, George McLean (brother)
 Stuart McLean, Steven McLean (son),  Brian McLean (son)
 McLean [3]: see Yuille
 Stephen McManus, Kris Doolan (cousin)
 Jimmy McMenemy, John McMenemy (son), Frank McMenemy (son), Harry McMenemy (son)
 Jackie McNamara Sr., Jackie McNamara Jr. (son)
 Willie McNaught, Ken McNaught (son)
 Henry McNeil, Peter McNeil (brother), Moses McNeil (brother)
 Malcolm McPhail, Bob McPhail (brother)
 McPhail [2]: see Gallacher
 James McPherson, John McPherson (brother), David McPherson (brother), Johnny McPherson (great-nephew – grandson of John)
 James Quar McPherson, Jim McPherson (son), Robert McPherson (son),  Edwin Dutton (son-in-law)
 Matt McQueen, Hugh McQueen (brother)
 Jimmy McStay, Willie McStay Sr. (brother), Willie McStay Jr. (great-nephew), Paul McStay (great-nephew), Ray McStay (great-nephew), John McStay (cousin of the younger Willie, Paul and Ray) Chris McStay (son of Paul)
 Jock McTavish, Bob McTavish (brother), John McTavish (nephew)
 William Miller, Adam Miller (brother), Tom Miller (brother), John Miller (brother)
 Willie Mills, Hugh Mills (brother)
 Jimmy Milne,  Gordon Milne (son)
  Bob Morrison,  Tommy Morrison (brother)
 Bob Morton, Alan Morton (brother)
 Bobby Murdoch, Billy Murdoch (brother)

N
Robert W. Neill, Quintin Neill (brother)
Jimmy Nelson,  Tony Nelson (son)
Joe Nibloe,  Jack Nibloe (son)

O
 Garry O'Connor, Josh O'Connor (son)
 Frank O'Donnell, Hugh O'Donnell (brother)
 Phil O'Donnell, Stephen O'Donnell (nephew), David Clarkson (nephew)
 Willie Ormond, Gibby Ormond (brother),  Bert Ormond (brother),  Ian Ormond (nephew, son of Bert),  Duncan Ormond (nephew, son of Bert),  Vicki Ormond (great-niece, daughter of Duncan)
 Tommy Orr, Neil Orr (son)
 Jimmy Oswald, John Oswald (brother)

P
 Jimmy Parlane, Derek Parlane (son)
 Steven Pressley, Aaron Pressley (son)
 Keith Pritchett,  James Pritchett (son)
Bob Pursell, Sr., Peter Pursell (brother), Bob Pursell, Jr. (nephew, son of Peter)

Q
Jimmy Quinn, Jimmy Quinn (grandson)

R
 Bill Raisbeck, Alex Raisbeck (brother), Andrew Raisbeck (brother), Luke Raisbeck (cousin)
 Jimmy Reid, Max Reid (brother), Davy Reid (brother), Jack Reid (brother),  Willie Reid (brother)
  Andy Rhodes,  Steve Agnew (brother-in-law), Jordan Rhodes (son)
 Bruce Rioch,  Neil Rioch (brother),  Gregor Rioch (son),  Matty Holmes (nephew)
 John L. Ritchie, Duncan Ritchie (cousin)
 David Robertson, Mason Robertson (son)
 Dianne Robertson (née McLaren), Scott Robertson (son)
 Natalie Ross, Frank Ross (brother)

S
 Alex Scott, Jim Scott (brother)
 Robert Scott, Matthew Scott (brother)
 Willie Scott, Jocky Scott (son)
 Shankly: see Blyth
 Ricky Sharp, Graeme Sharp (brother)
 Jock Shaw, Davie Shaw (brother)
 Dave Shearer, Duncan Shearer (brother)
 Andrew Shinnie, Graeme Shinnie (brother)
 Jimmy Simpson, Ronnie Simpson (son)
Leslie Skene, Clyde Skene (brother)
Doug Smith, Dave Smith (brother), Hugh Smith (brother)
James Smith, Robert Smith (brother)
Jimmy Smith, Joe Smith (brother)
 Mattha Smith, Gordon Smith (grandson)
 Nicol Smith, Jimmy Smith (son)
 Peter Somers, Bill Somers (son), John Somers (son)
 John Souttar,  Harry Souttar (brother)
 Spencer: see Davies
  Archie Stark,  Tommy Stark (brother)
 John Stevenson, George Stevenson (brother)
 David Stewart, Andy Stewart (brother)
 Jim Stewart, Colin Stewart (son – also husband of Julie Fleeting – above)
 Sandy Stewart, Scott Stewart (son)
 Gordon Strachan, Gavin Strachan (son), Craig Strachan (son), Luke Strachan (grandson)
 David Steele,  David Shaw (grandson)
 Paul Sturrock, Blair Sturrock (son)

T
 Greg Taylor, Ally Taylor (brother)
 Willie Toner, Kevin Toner (son)

V
Jock Venters, Alex Venters (brother)

W
 Abraham Wales, Sr., Abraham Wales, Jr. (son), Hugh Wales (son)
 Bobby Walker, Alex Walker (brother), George Walker (nephew), Bobby Hogg (brother-in-law of George),  Tom Fenner (brother-in-law of George)
 Frank Walker, Jim Walker (brother), Willie Walker (brother)
 Tommy Walker, Steven Tweed (nephew)
 William Walker, Isaac Walker (brother)
 Alexander Watson Hutton,  Arnold Watson Hutton (son)
 Philip Watson, Phil Watson (son)
 David Weir,  Jensen Weir (son)
 Eddie White, John White (brother), Tom White (brother) 
 Willie White, Jock White (brother), Tom White (brother), James White (brother), Andrew Anderson (brother-in-law)
 Alex Willoughby, Jim Forrest (cousin)
 Andrew Wilson, David Wilson (brother), James Wilson (brother), Alec Wilson (brother)
 Andy Wilson,  Jimmy Wilson (son)
 David Wilson, George Wilson (brother)
 Hughie Wilson,  Jock Wilson (son)
 Robbie Winters, David Winters (brother – also husband of Suzanne Grant, above)
 Eddie Wolecki Black, Emma Black (wife)
 Jocky Wright,  Billy Wright (son),  Doug Wright (son)

Y
 Benny Yorston, Harry Yorston (nephew)
 Alex Young, Jason Young (son)
 William Yuille, Willie McLean (grandson), Jim McLean (grandson), Tommy McLean (grandson)

See also
List of English association football families

Notes

References

Scot
Association football in Scotland lists
Family
Association football player non-biographical articles